Guy-Elie Boulingui (born 4 April 1968) is a Gabonese boxer. He competed in the men's flyweight event at the 1996 Summer Olympics.

References

External links
 

1968 births
Living people
Gabonese male boxers
Olympic boxers of Gabon
Boxers at the 1996 Summer Olympics
Place of birth missing (living people)
Flyweight boxers
21st-century Gabonese people